Jedburgh Abbey, a ruined Augustinian abbey which was founded in the 12th century, is situated in the town of Jedburgh, in the Scottish Borders  north of the border with England at Carter Bar.

History
Towards the middle of the 9th century, when the area around Jedburgh was part of the Anglo-Saxon Kingdom of Northumbria, there were two Gedworths (as Jedburgh was then known). One of them became the Jedburgh we know now, the other was four miles to the south. According to Symeon of Durham, Ecgred, bishop of Lindisfarne from 830AD to 845AD, gifted the two villages of the same name to the See of Lindisfarne. The southerly Gedworth was the place of Ecgred's church, the first church in the parish. The present town was distinguished from the long disappeared south village by UBI CASTELLUM EST meaning, 'where the castle is'. The only solid evidence of Ecgred's church came from Symeon of Durham when he described the burial, at the church of Geddewerde, of Eadulf, one of the assassins of Walcher, Bishop of Durham.

In 1118, prior to his ascension to the Scottish throne, Prince David established a foundation of canons regular of the order of St. Augustine at what is now Jedburgh. The foundation appeared to have the status of 'priory' in the early years and a man by the name of Daniel was described as the Prior of Geddwrda in 1139. The church was later raised to the status of monastery before becoming, in the years prior to King David's death in 1153, a fully fledged abbey dedicated to the Virgin Mary, probably in 1147.

Over the years, Jedburgh has been described by 83 different names or spellings.

Following the death of King David, the patronage and privileges of the abbey were accorded to his grandsons Malcolm IV of Scotland and William I of Scotland, also known as William the Lion. The King's son, Henry, had preceded his father in death. The nave and the choir were built in the 13th century and were in place by the time Alexander III of Scotland married Yolande, daughter of the Comte de Dreux on 14 October 1285 at the church. The great abbey was said to contain the finery of the best of Norman and early English Architecture. The Abbey Church of St. Mary of Jedeworth was growing in stature and importance and the abbot was even invited to attend Scottish Parliaments. As well as the lands and chapels in southern Scotland, Jedburgh Abbey owned great lands in Northumberland. In 1296, the Abbot of Jedburgh swore fealty to Edward I of England at Berwick-on-Tweed.
Edward intended to rule the abbey and presented William de Jarum as the new Abbot of Jedburgh in 1296. After the defeat of the Earl of Surrey in 1297 at Stirling at the hands of William Wallace, the abbey was pillaged and wrecked by the English as retribution. Robert I of Scotland (The Bruce) continued to patronise the church during his reign in the early 14th century. In 1346, after the Scottish defeat at the Battle of Neville's Cross, the English once again slighted the church. Later that century, in 1370, David II of Scotland was instrumental in the completion of the north transept we can still see today. The abbey faced more torture and destruction in 1410,1416 and by the Earl of Warwick in 1464. In 1523, the town and abbey were set ablaze by the Earl of Surrey. The abbey faced more indignity in 1544 at the hands of the Earl of Hertford. The end came for the great Abbey of St. Mary of Jedburgh in 1560 with the coming of the Scottish Reformation.

Jedburgh Grammar School was founded by the monks of Jedburgh Abbey in the late 15th. century.

The Reformation and beyond
When the Protestant Reformation arrived in 1560, the monks were allowed to stay but the abbey was used as the parish kirk for the reformed religion. In 1671 the church was removed to the western part of the nave for safety reasons. This situation persisted until, in 1871, it was considered unsafe to continue worship at the abbey church and a new parish church was built. The Marquis of Lothian immediately started work on the restoration of the great church but in 1917 the church was handed over to the state and is now in the care of Historic Environment Scotland as a scheduled monument.

Burials
 Eadulf Rus
 John Capellanus - Bishop of Glasgow
 Hugh de Roxburgh - Bishop of Glasgow

Tourism
This Abbey along with three others (Kelso, Dryburgh and Melrose) and other historic sights is on the Borders Abbeys Way walk.

See also
 Abbot of Jedburgh, for a list of priors, abbots and commendators
List of places in the Scottish Borders
List of places in Scotland

References

External links

Historic Environment Scotland: Visitor guide
Photos

Augustinian monasteries in Scotland
Religious organizations established in the 1130s
Christian monasteries established in the 12th century
1138 establishments in Scotland
Churches in the Scottish Borders
Ruined abbeys in the Scottish Borders
Ruined abbeys and monasteries
Historic Scotland properties in the Scottish Borders
Jedburgh
Scheduled Ancient Monuments in the Scottish Borders